The 2012 McDonald's Burnie International was a professional tennis tournament played on hard courts. It was the tenth edition of the tournament which is part of the 2012 ATP Challenger Tour and ITF Women's Circuit. It took place in Burnie, Tasmania, Australia between 30 January and 5 February 2012.

ATP singles main-draw entrants

Seeds

 Rankings are as of January 16, 2012.

Other entrants
The following players received wildcards into the singles main draw:
  Maverick Banes
  Samuel Groth
  John Millman
  John-Patrick Smith

The following players received entry from the qualifying draw:
  Colin Ebelthite
  Adam Feeney
  Isaac Frost
  Joshua Milton

The following players received entry as a Lucky loser:
  Jose Statham

Champions

Men's singles

 Danai Udomchoke def.  Samuel Groth, 7–6(7–5), 6–3

Men's doubles

 John Peers /  John-Patrick Smith def.  Divij Sharan /  Vishnu Vardhan, 6–2, 6–4

Women's singles

 Olivia Rogowska def.  Irina Khromacheva, 6–3, 6–3

Women's doubles

 Arina Rodionova /  Melanie South def.  Stephanie Bengson /  Tyra Calderwood, 6–2, 6–2

External links
Official Website
ATP official site

2012 ATP Challenger Tour
2012 ITF Women's Circuit
2012 in Australian tennis
2012
January 2012 sports events in Australia
February 2012 sports events in Australia